The Knox-Gore Baronetcy, of Belleek Manor in the County of Mayo, was a title in the Baronetage of the United Kingdom. It was created on 5 December 1868 for Francis Knox-Gore, Lord Lieutenant of Sligo. The title became extinct on the death of the second Baronet in 1890.

Knox-Gore baronets, of Belleek Manor (1868)
Sir Francis Arthur Knox-Gore, 1st Baronet (1803–1873)
Sir Charles James Knox-Gore, 2nd Baronet (1831–1890)

References

Extinct baronetcies in the Baronetage of the United Kingdom